Serkovo is a rural locality (a village) in Oktyabrskoye Rural Settlement, Vyaznikovsky District, Vladimir Oblast, Russia. The population was 892 as of 2010.

Geography 
The village is located 1 km from Pivovarovo, 20 km south-west from Vyazniki, 10 km from Senkovo.

References 

Rural localities in Vyaznikovsky District